NGC 5930 is a starburst galaxy in the constellation Boötes that is interacting with the nearby Seyfert galaxy NGC 5929. 5930 has a morphological classification of SAB(rs)b pec, indicating that it is a weakly-barred spiral galaxy with a poorly defined nuclear ring structure. It is inclined at an angle of 46° to the line of sight from the Earth.

References

External links

Distance 
Image NGC 5930

Interacting galaxies
NGC 5930
5930
09852
090
Intermediate spiral galaxies